Truck was a spinoff of Singapore pop rock band The October Cherries, consisting of three of its members, vocalist/bassist Jeremiah "Jay" Shotam, guitarist Peter Diaz, and drummer Richard Khan. Their only release, Surprise, Surprise, was issued on Jay's brother Balram's label, Baal Records in 1974. Like the October Cherries, it was influenced by The Beatles, but with heavier psychedelic leanings.

Background
According to an article "A Trip Around the World" in Record Collector magazine, 06 August 2011, the tracks on the album were previously used backing tracks from past October Cherries recordings. New overdubs of vocals, guitars and synthesizers were added by Richard Khan and Benny Siew. The result was a new album with a somewhat psychedelic feeling.

Given that this album was released during Singapore's clampdown period of the early-to-mid 70s, which drastically hindered local distribution and media coverage of what was deemed "Yellow Culture" (including hard rock, heavy metal and/or psychedlic-oriented rock music), the album sold poorly and quickly fell into obscurity. According to Jay Shotam, it would subsequently be heavily pirated over the years, although exact sales figures, authentic or not, aren't known.  

Surprise, Surprise was officially re-issued on CD and LP by Spanish label Guerssen Records in 2004, albeit with scarce, inaccurate information, including that the band is from Malaysia and that the exact names and roles of the band are unknown.

References

External links
 Guerssen Records
 A review of "Surprise, Surprise"
 Discogs: Truck

Malaysian musical groups